Marie-Germaine Bousser (born 11 August 1943) is a French neuroscientist. She won the Brain Prize in 2019 for her work on CADASIL.

Biography 
Bousser graduated from Paris-Sorbonne University in neuro-psychiatry in 1972 with her thesis devoted to the prevention of cortical artery thrombosis in rabbits by aspirin and PGE1.

She trained at the Pitié-Salpêtrière Hospital. Subsequently, she worked at the National Hospital for Neurology and Neurosurgery, before returning to Paris. She became a Professor of Neurology at Pitié-Salpêtrière Hospital in 1981. She became head of neurology at the Saint-Antoine Hospital in Paris in 1989, where she stayed until 1997. She returned to Pitié-Salpêtrière Hospital in 1997, becoming the head of neurology there. She later became Emeritus Professor at the Paris-Diderot University.

Research 
Bousser is most well known for her role in the discovery of CADASIL, a hereditary form of stroke. She researched the, then unnamed, condition for the first time in 1976, when a patient entered her clinic with signs of Binswanger's disease after suffering a stroke. She found that the condition was hereditary after children of the initial patient presented similar symptoms. In 1993 she showed, together with Elisabeth Tournier-Lasserve, that the condition was caused by a mutation on chromosome 19. They subsequently named the condition CADASIL.

Awards 
Bousser is Commander of the Legion of Honor (2013) and Grand Officer of the Order of Merit (2018)
 2008 Johann Jakob Wepfer Prize
 2012 World Stroke Organisation President's Award
 2019 Brain Prize

References 

1943 births
Living people
People from Choisy-le-Roi
French neurologists
Women neurologists
French neuroscientists
20th-century French scientists
21st-century French scientists
Paris-Sorbonne University alumni
Commandeurs of the Légion d'honneur